The name Anish is derived from Sanskrit. It means "supreme". The name also shares references to Shiva and Vishnu.

Notable people with the name include:
Anish Kapoor (born 1954), Indian sculptor
Anish Giri (born 1994), Dutch chess player
Anish Shroff, American sportscaster
Anish Sood (born 1989), Indian music producer
Anish Tejeshwar, Indian actor and director
Anish Shilpi,

See also
Anish (river)

References

Indian given names